Dennis Fernández (born 23 January 1986) is a Cuban male triple jumper, who won an individual gold medal at the Youth World Championships.

References

External links

1986 births
Living people
Cuban male triple jumpers